Al Dera'a FC  is a Saudi Arabian football team in Dawadmi City playing at the Saudi Second Division.

Current squad 
As of Saudi Third Division:

References

External links
 Al Dera'a FC at Kooora.com

Dera'a
1976 establishments in Saudi Arabia
Association football clubs established in 1976
Football clubs in Dawadmi